John Joseph Brennan (1913–1976) was a Northern Irish politician. He stood for the British House of Commons in Belfast West at the 1959 UK general election, representing the Independent Labour Group, receiving 37.6% of the vote.

In 1962 he stood for the Belfast Falls constituency at the 1962 Northern Ireland election, before becoming a founder member of the National Democratic Party.

Under the National Democratic banner, Brennan won Belfast Central at the 1965 Northern Ireland election without facing an opponent - the only member of that party to win election at this level.

However, at the 1969 Northern Ireland election, he was defeated by Paddy Kennedy of the Republican Labour Party.

References
Biographies of Members of the Northern Ireland House of Commons

 

1913 births
1976 deaths
Members of the House of Commons of Northern Ireland 1965–1969
National Democratic Party (Northern Ireland) members of the House of Commons of Northern Ireland
Politicians from Belfast
Members of the House of Commons of Northern Ireland for Belfast constituencies